This is a list of awards and nominations received by Jeremy Renner, American actor. He has been formally recognized for roles in Fish in a Barrel (2001), Dahmer (2002), S.W.A.T. (2003), Neo Ned (2005), Take (2007), The Hurt Locker (2008), The Town (2010), The Avengers (2012), American Hustle (2013), The Immigrant (2013) and Kill the Messenger (2014). While Fish in a Barrel (2001) marked Renner's first formal distinction of his film career, his performance as the titular character in Dahmer (2002) earned him his first major industry nomination for Best Male Lead at the 2003 Independent Spirit Awards. Following this success, Renner has most notably achieved two Academy Award nominations for Best Actor and Best Supporting Actor for his roles in The Hurt Locker (2008) and The Town (2010), respectively. In 2014, Renner won his first Broadcast Film Critics Association Award and Screen Actors Guild Award for Best Acting Ensemble alongside the cast of American Hustle (2013).

Industry

Academy Awards

BAFTA Film Awards

Critics' Choice Movie Awards

Golden Globe Awards

Independent Spirit Awards

Screen Actors Guild Awards

Critics

Women Film Journalists

Boston Film Critics

Chicago Film Critics

Dallas-Fort Worth Film Critics

Denver Film Critics Society

Detroit Film Critics

Dorian

Gotham

Houston Film Critics

Indiana Film Journalists

Las Vegas Film Critics

National Board of Review

National Society of Critics

New York Film Critics

Online New York Critics

North Texas Film Critics

Online Film Critics

Phoenix Film Critics

San Diego Film Critics

Satellite

Southeastern Film Critics

St. Louis Film Critics

Utah Film Critics

Vancouver Film Critics

Village Voice Poll

Washington Film Critics

Women Film Critics

Film Festivals

Hollywood

Karlovy Vary

Newport Beach

New York

Palm Beach

Palm Springs

Phoenix

International

Huading

Jupiter

Taormina

Others

Kids Choice

MTV

People's Choice

Teen Choice

Notes

References

External links 
 Awards received by Jeremy Renner at the Internet Movie Database

Renner, Jeremy